Saraighat College, established in 1981, is a general degree undergraduate, coeducational college situated at Changsari, in Kamrup district, Assam. This college is affiliated with the Gauhati University.

Departments

Assamese
Anthropology
English
Geography
History
Mathematics
Education
Economics
Philosophy
Political Science
Persian Studies
Tourism & Travel Management

References

External links
http://saraighatcollegeghy.org/

Universities and colleges in Assam
Colleges affiliated to Gauhati University
Educational institutions established in 1981
1981 establishments in Assam